Valerie Wilson Wesley (born November 22, 1947) is an American author of mysteries, adult-theme novels, and children's books, and a former executive editor of Essence magazine. She is the author of the Tamara Hayle mystery series. Her writings, both fiction and non-fiction, have also appeared in numerous publications, including Essence, Family Circle, TV Guide, Ms., The New York Times, and the Swiss weekly magazine Die Weltwoche.

Background 

Wesley grew up in Ashford, Connecticut. She is African-American. She graduated from Howard University and earned master's degrees from the Bank Street College of Education and the Columbia Graduate School of Journalism. A former resident of East Orange, New Jersey, she now lives in Montclair, New Jersey, with her two daughters and playwright husband Richard Wesley.

Published books
 Afro-Bets Book of Black Heroes from A to Z: An introduction to important Black achievers for young readers, with Wade Hudson (1988, Orange, New Jersey: Just Us Books)
 When Death Comes Stealing, a Tamara Hayle mystery (1994, New York: G.P. Putnam's Sons)
 Devil's Gonna Get Him, a Tamara Hayle mystery (1996, New York: Avon Books)
 Where Evil Sleeps, a Tamara Hayle mystery (1996, New York: G.P. Putnam's Sons)
 Freedom's Gifts: A Juneteenth story, illustrated by Sharon Wilson (1997, New York: Simon & Schuster Books for Young Readers)
 No Hiding Place, a Tamara Hayle mystery (1997, New York: G.P. Putnam's Sons)
 Easier to Kill, a Tamara Hayle mystery (1998, New York: G.P. Putnam's Sons)
 Ain't Nobody's Business if I Do (1999, New York: Avon Books)
 The Devil Riding, a Tamara Hayle mystery (2000, New York: Putnam)
 Always True to You in My Fashion (2002, New York: William Morrow)
 How to Lose Your Class Pet, illustrated by Maryn Roos (2003, New York: Jump at the Sun)
 Dying in the Dark: A Tamara Hayle mystery (2004, New York: One World Ballantine Books)
 How to Fish for Trouble, illustrated by Maryn Roos (2004, New York: Jump at the Sun)
 How to Lose Your Cookie Money, illustrated by Maryn Roos (2004, New York: Jump at the Sun)
 23 Ways to Mess up Valentine's Day (2005, New York: Jump at the Sun)
 How to (almost) Ruin Your School Play, illustrated by Maryn Roos (2005, New York: Jump at the Sun/Hyperion Books for Children)
 Playing My Mother's Blues (2005, New York: William Morrow)

Awards and honors
 1993 – Griot Award from the New York Chapter of the National Association of Black Journalists
 1995 – Nominee for Shamus Award for Best First P.I. Novel (When Death Comes Stealing)
 2000 – Excellence in Adult Fiction award from the Black Caucus of the American Library Association

References

 "Biography', Valerie Wilson Wesly web site (Retrieved October 23, 2006)
 Brizak, Rosemarie Louise, Tiesha Renee Cooper, Rachel Elizabeth Feller, and Wanda Michelle Raynes. "Valerie Wilson Wesley", VG: Voices from the Gaps, University of Minnesota, December 5, 2004 (Retrieved October 22, 2006).
 "Valerie Wilson Wesley" on the dust jacket of Ain't Nobody's Business if I Do, New York: William Morrow, 1999. .

External links
 Valerie Wilson Wesley web site
 "BIBR talks to Valerie Wilson Wesley – Interview", interview by Linda Jones in Black Issues Book Review, November–December, 2002.

20th-century American novelists
21st-century American novelists
American children's writers
African-American children's writers
American women novelists
African-American novelists
People from Ashford, Connecticut
Writers from East Orange, New Jersey
People from Montclair, New Jersey
Howard University alumni
Bank Street College of Education alumni
American women journalists
American women children's writers
20th-century American women writers
21st-century American women writers
African-American women journalists
African-American journalists
Women mystery writers
Novelists from New Jersey
20th-century American non-fiction writers
21st-century American non-fiction writers
1947 births
Living people
20th-century African-American women writers
20th-century African-American writers
21st-century African-American women writers
21st-century African-American writers